Houston Dynamo 2 is an American professional soccer team that is located in Houston, Texas. It is the reserve team of Houston Dynamo FC and participates in MLS Next Pro.

History 
On December 6, 2021, Houston Dynamo FC were named as one of 21 clubs that would field a team in the new MLS Next Pro league beginning in the 2022 season.

Players and staff

Current roster

Staff 
 Kenny Bundy – Head Coach
 Daniel Roberts – Assistant Coach
 Roy Lassiter – Assistant Coach

Team records

Season-by-season

Head coaches record 

 Includes Regular season & Playoffs

See also 

 MLS Next Pro

References

External links 
 

Association football clubs established in 2021
2021 establishments in Texas
Houston Dynamo FC
Soccer clubs in Texas
Reserve soccer teams in the United States
MLS Next Pro teams